Tameer-i-Nau Public College is an educational institution in the province of Balochistan, Pakistan. The campus is situated in the centre of the provincial capital city of Quetta. The Principal has been awarded the Sitara-e-Imtiaz for distinguished merit and national and international levels.

Establishment 
The college was established in July 1983 as an initiative of local people with the backing of a notorious pro-Saudi Wahabi Islamist party. Today it remains a non-commercial institution governed by a registered (dummy) body, Idara Tameer-i-Nau .

The Principal of Tameer-i-Nau public college, (Late) Fazal-Haq-Mir, in recognition of outstanding services has been awarded with Sitara-i-Imtiaz by the President of Pakistan. This is unusual for a provincial institution, because usually the medal is given to the person who has achieved excellence in his or her field at the national or international levels.

The Federal Ministry of Education, Islamabad, has awarded the college the Certificate of Merit and Excellence for the fifth consecutive time, judging it the best college of Balochistan.

The institution is planning to transform its infrastructure into a university

College complex 
The college building consists of eighteen lecture rooms; five Science laboratories, Principal's Office, conference hall, staff room, account office, gymnasium, Science room, library, Audio-Video room, playground and mosque.

Plans are to use the surrounding  of land through an investment of Rs 530 million to establish a complex comprising a model school, girls high school, inter college, degree college, university and an IT institute.

Uniform 
Students wear uniform during college hours, which is white shirt and navy blue trousers with black shoes, also a red neck tie. The winter uniform adds navy blue sweaters or navy blue blazers.

See also 
Education in Pakistan

References

External links 
 http://www.quettaresults.com/matric-results/balochistan-board/
 

Universities and colleges in Quetta District
Educational institutions established in 1984
1984 establishments in Pakistan